William Yalland (27 June 1889 – 23 October 1914) was an English cricketer. He was a right-handed batsman who played for Gloucestershire. He was born in Fishponds and killed in action when he was shot through the head while defending a trench at the First Battle of Ypres during World War I.

Yalland made a single first-class appearance for the team, during the 1910 County Championship, against Somerset. Batting in the lower order, Yalland scored a single run in the only innings in which he batted.

References

External links
William Yalland at Cricket Archive 

1889 births
1914 deaths
British military personnel of World War I
Military personnel from Bristol
20th-century British military personnel
English cricketers
Gloucestershire cricketers
British military personnel killed in World War I